is a Japanese professional tennis player. She has been ranked as high as No. 56 in singles and No. 43 in doubles by the Women's Tennis Association (WTA).  Hibino has won two singles and two doubles titles on the WTA Tour. Along with that, she has won eight singles titles and eight doubles titles on the ITF Circuit.

Hibino made her breakthrough in 2015, when she won her first WTA Tour title in singles at the Tashkent Open. As a result, she debuted in the top 100. Since then, she spent all weeks inside top 150 and several years in the top 100. She has represented Japan at national competitions, debuting at the Billie Jean King Cup in 2016 and at the Summer Olympics in 2021.

Personal life and background
Hibino was born on November 28, 1994, in Ichinomiya, Japan. Coming from a tennis-loving family, she is named after former top-20 player Naoko Sawamatsu, while her brother is named after Shuzo Matsuoka. She also has one older sister. At the age of 10, she and her brother were introduced to tennis by their mother.

In 2015, Hibino moved to Kobe, Japan for training. She enjoys spending time with her family because she rarely gets the chance to live with them.  When she returns home, she often goes shopping with her sister and takes their dogs for a walk. She also likes reading and often reads in her spare time. Hibino enjoys eating local foods and sightseeing at famous places while travelling on tour. Since a young age, she has dreamt of playing on the Centre Court of Wimbledon.

Junior career
Hibino reached a career-high ranking of No. 54 as a junior. She began playing on the ITF Junior Circuit in January 2009 at the age of 14. The following March, she made her debut at the Grade 1 Japan Open in Nagoya, reaching the second round in both the singles and doubles events. Three weeks later, she won her first junior singles title at the Grade 4 Gallipoli Youth Tennis Cup in Queensland after defeating Ashleigh Barty in the final. There she also won her first doubles title. In October, she played her strongest tournament to date, the Grade A Osaka Mayor's Cup, where she advanced to the second round. She had a better result in doubles, reaching the quarterfinal alongside Mana Ayukawa.

After starting the 2011 season with an early loss at the Grade-1 Loy Yang Traralgon International in Traralgon, she made her Grand Slam debut at the Australian Open. In singles, she reached the second round, while in doubles she lost in the first round alongside Emily Fanning. At her next tournament, the Grade-1 Chang LTAT ITF Junior Championships in Nonthaburi, Hibino achieved her most significant result to date in singles, getting to the semi-finals. Two weeks later, she had her biggest result in doubles as well, winning her first Grade-1 title at the Mitsubishi-Lancer International Championships in Manila. In her two following tournaments, she won two Grade-4 events in Australia in both the singles and doubles, including the one in Queensland where she defended her titles. Her singles performance then started to decline, as she lost in the early rounds at tournaments such as the French Open, Wimbledon, the Canadian Open, the US Open, the Osaka Mayor's Cup, and the Japan Open. However, her doubles performance continued to lead to good results as she reached the semifinals of the Canadian Open and Osaka Mayor's Cup. She closed out the season with a singles quarterfinal and a doubles title at the Grade B1 Seogwipo Asian/Oceania Closed International Championships in Jeju-Do.

The 2012 season was the final junior season for Hibino. She played once again at the Australian Open but again had little success with only a second round appearance in singles and a first round appearance in doubles. Her last tournament was the Grade-1 Mitsubishi-Lancer International Juniors Championships in Manila, where she reached the semi-final in singles and quarterfinal in doubles. As a junior, she won four singles and five doubles titles in total on the ITF Junior Circuit.

Professional career

2012–14: Successful start on the ITF Circuit, WTA Tour debut
Hibino began playing on the ITF Women's Circuit in May 2012 at the age of 17. She played in the  qualifying draw of the $25k tournament in Karuizawa in the singles event but failed to reach the main draw. Nonetheless, she made her debut in the doubles event. A month later, she was given a wildcard for the singles main draw of the $10k tournament in Tokyo. She took advantage of the wildcard and won the title in her debut appearance. The following week, she continued with success, winning another $10k title, this time in Mie. This performance put her on the WTA rankings for the first time, getting to No. 974 in singles. In September of the same year, she won her first ITF doubles title in Kyoto along with the title in singles as well. A week later, she debuted in the doubles rankings as well, getting to No. 1066.

After not having such impressive results during the first four months of 2013, she reached her first bigger ITF final at the $50k Kangaroo Cup in Gifu, in the doubles event. Three weeks later, she won her first doubles title of the season at the $25k event in Goyang. Her results improved in singles during the second half of the year. In early September, she won the $25k tournament in Tsukuba after defeating fellow Japanese player Erika Sema. Then, in late September, she got her first attempt at playing on the WTA Tour, after getting a wildcard for the qualifying draw of the WTA 1000 Pan Pacific Open. She faced 14th seed Ashleigh Barty but lost in straight sets. Not long after that, she got another chance for her WTA Tour debut at the Japan Open in Tokyo. She made it through the first round of the qualifying draw, after beating her compatriot Miki Miyamura but then was beaten by Zarina Diyas. During the year, Hibino improved her ranking. In singles, she rose from world No. 576 in the opening week to No. 291 as her year-end ranking. In doubles, she advanced from No. 1069 to No. 327.

During the season of 2014, Hibino advanced to a couple of quarter-finals and semi-finals on the ITF Circuit and reached one final in both singles and doubles, at the $25k Fergana Challenger. In both events, she failed to win the trophy. However, she made some progress, making her WTA Tour main-draw debut at the Japan Women's Open in the doubles event where she partnered with Riko Sawayanagi. That year, she had her first chance for her Grand Slam main-draw debut but lost in the qualifying at the US Open. She made mild progress in the singles rankings, getting to No. 204 in July, her highest singles ranking at the time.

2015: Breakthrough and first WTA title, top 100

Despite making progress in the previous seasons, Hibino was still limited to playing mainly at the ITF tournaments. However, she continued to excel there. Her first title of the year happened in early April at the $15k Bangkok tournament in doubles. Then, the following week, she advanced to the final of the $25k Ahmedabad tournament, also in doubles. A month later, at the $50k Fukuoka International, she reached her first singles final after almost a year. She failed to win the title against Kristýna Plíšková but then the following week, she won the $50K Kurume tournament, after beating Eri Hozumi. She then lost in Wimbledon qualifying, but followed up with another ITF singles title at the $50k Stockton Challenger. In late July, she won both singles and doubles titles at the $50k Lexington Challenger.

Hibino then was really close to making her Grand Slam main-draw debut, reaching the final stage of qualifying of the US Open but did not manage to qualify after losing to Kateryna Bondarenko, where she won only two games. Two weeks later, she made her singles WTA Tour debut, playing at the Japan Women's Open. She entered the main draw as a wildcard player and also won her first WTA match, after defeating her compatriot Hiroko Kuwata. This helped her to enter qualifying of the Premier-level Pan Pacific Open but she was stopped again by Bondarenko in the final stage of qualification. Nonetheless, the following week she made big progress, winning her first WTA singles title at the Tashkent Open. In the final, she defeated Donna Vekić. The victory helped her debut inside the top 100 of the WTA singles rankings, rising up to No. 76. By the end of the year, she advanced to the semifinal of the WTA 125 Hua Hin Championships, followed up with the final of the $100k Tokyo tournament that made her move to No. 66 in the singles rankings.

2016–17: Continued progress, first WTA doubles title

Having made it to relatively few WTA main draws in previous years, Hibino mostly played tour-level events in 2016 as a result of being in the top 100. She began the year with a quarterfinal at the Auckland Open, after defeating two top 100 players but then lost to top 50 player Julia Görges. The next week, she advanced to the second round of the Hobart International. Right after that, she reached her highest singles ranking in the first week of the following Australian Open. With her improvement in ranking from previous years, she did not have to play in Grand Slam qualifying and made her singles Grand Slam main-draw debut the Australian Open. In her debut, she lost to former world No. 1, Maria Sharapova, in the first round. Her improvement continued with her WTA 1000 debut at the Qatar Open, where she defeated Yaroslava Shvedova before losing to world No. 5, Garbiñe Muguruza. She then suffered first-round losses at the WTA 1000 Indian Wells and Miami Open.

As a seed for the first time on a tour-level event, Hibino made it into the quarterfinals of the İstanbul Cup. She then did not perform well at either the French Open or Wimbledon, losing in the first round. However, it was her first main draw appearance at both. In early August, she advanced to another WTA quarterfinal, this time at the Brasil Tennis Cup in Florianópolis but lost to Irina-Camelia Begu. She followed this performance by playing for Japan at the Summer Olympics in Rio, where this time she was able to defeat Begu but then lost to Muguruza. With her debut at the US Open, she played the main draw at all four Grand Slam tournaments, but again lost in the first round. She closed the season with a final at the Tashkent Open in singles and the title of the $100K Poitiers tournament in doubles. This season was the first one for Hibino when she spent a whole year inside the top 100 in singles. In doubles, she debuted in the top 100 in September and spent the rest of the year there.

Hibino began the year of 2017 ranked No. 93 in the world. Despite being in the top 100, she was still forced to play some qualifying draws. She had a disappointing start. After being knocked out in the first round at the Australian Open, she lost in qualifying at several WTA 1000 tournaments, including the Dubai Tennis Championships, the Indian Wells Open, and the Miami Open. Nonetheless, she rebounded at the following tournament, getting to a final at the Malaysian Open. After defeating Maryna Zanevska in the first round, she got a walkover victory due to withdrawal of Elina Svitolina. Subsequent victories over Lesley Kerkhove and Magda Linette sent her into the final. There she faced qualifier Ashleigh Barty but lost in straight sets. She rebounded at the Monterrey Open in April, winning her first doubles title. Alongside Alicja Rosolska, she defeated Dalila Jakupović and Nadiia Kichenok in the final. Her losing in qualifying at WTA 1000 tournaments continued in Madrid and Rome. After first-round losses at the French Open and Wimbledon, she managed to win three matches in a row in singles for the first time since March. She did so at the Jiangxi Open in Nanchang but lost to Peng Shuai in the final. At the US Open, she recorded her first singles Grand Slam win after defeating CiCi Bellis in a three-set match in the first round. Later, at the Tashkent Open, she reached the final in doubles but failed to win the title. In May, she debuted in the top 50 in doubles and later rose to No. 43 in July, her highest doubles ranking. She spent almost all year inside the top 100 in singles, being outside for only four weeks.

2018–20: Inconsistency, first top-10 win

Despite good progress in previous years, Hibino started to struggle with results. This was particularly reflected in results in singles. She fell outside the top 100 in late February and did not return for the rest of the year. In doubles, she fared better, reaching the final of the Taiwan Open in February. With a lower singles ranking, she dropped back to the ITF Circuit. Her first final came in July at the $60k Honolulu Championships in the singles event. She later won first doubles title of the year at the $100k Suzhou Open in October. In the meantime, she lost in the first round at the Australian Open and did not get past qualifying at the French Open or US Open.

The following year, she continued to struggle with results for the next nine months. She lost in qualifying at all four Grand Slam tournaments and did not do well either in WTA 1000 tournaments such as the Indian Wells Open, the Miami Open, or the Canadian Open. Despite not reaching any at least a quarterfinal in any tour-level events since the beginning of the season, Hibino then made significant progress at the Japan Open in Hiroshima. She won titles in both singles and doubles. To get the title in singles, she needed to defeat four out of five better-ranked players than her, including two top 100 players: Zarina Diyas and seed No. 1, Hsieh Su-wei. Winning in straight sets over her compatriot Misaki Doi, Hibino won the title. That was the first all-Japanese WTA tournament final in 22 years. In doubles, she partnered with Doi and they defeated Christina McHale and Valeria Savinykh in the final. That was the first time that she won both events in the same WTA tournament. With these results, she returned to the top 100. In her next three tournaments, she produced more great results in doubles. First, at the Premier-level Pan Pacific Open, she advanced to the semifinal, followed up by a final at the Tianjin Open. A month later, she won the title at the $100k Shenzhen Open.

After losing in qualifying at the Auckland Open in the opening week of 2020, Hibino then reached the main draw of the Australian Open after three wins in qualifying. In the opening main-draw round, she defeated Peng Shuai in a three-set match. The victory over Peng was her second Grand Slam singles match win. This brought her back to the top 100. Next, she advanced to the semifinal of the Hua Hin Championships, after recording her first top-10 win over Svitolina. However, she could not build on this success in the following round, losing to qualifier Leonie Küng. After tennis resumed in August due to COVID-19, she suffered three consecutive losses at the Cincinnati Open, US Open, and Italian Open. However, she made it her second semifinal of the year at the Internationaux de Strasbourg. On her road to the semifinal, she defeated three top-100 players, including two former Grand Slam champions: Sloane Stephens and Jeļena Ostapenko. She then lost to Elena Rybakina to miss the final. Hibino closed out the year with her first win at the French Open, a victory over qualifier Marta Kostyuk in the first round. Ons Jabeur knocked her out in the following round.

2021: Olympics debut, first WTA final in two years
Hibino started year with a Grand Slam match win over wildcard player Astra Sharma at the Australian Open. She then failed in reaching her first third round there, losing to Kristina Mladenovic in straight sets. She then had five consecutive first round losses, including one at the WTA 1000 Miami Open. Despite that, she advanced to her first quarterfinal of the 2021 season at the green clay event, the Charleston Open. In the quarterfinal she lost to later finalist Ons Jabeur. She then continued with mostly first-round losses but managed to win one match at each of the French Open and Wimbledon. Her next step was playing at the 2020 Tokyo Olympics in her home country, Japan. She lost in the opening round to Serbian player Nina Stojanović. During the year, she had success in reaching one WTA final in the doubles event at the İstanbul Cup. Together with her compatriot Makoto Ninomiya, she lost to the Russian–Belgian combination of Veronika Kudermetova and Elise Mertens in straight sets. This final was the first for Hibino since the end of 2019. At the Olympics, she also played in doubles alongside Ninomiya but the lost in the first round to the Australian team of Ashleigh Barty and Storm Sanders.

2022
She entered the main draw of the new WTA 1000 Guadalajara Open as a lucky loser.

National representation
Hibino has played at the Fed Cup for Japan since 2016. She has played in ten ties, compiling an overall record of 6–5, playing only in singles. Her debut was when Japan was in Zone Group I along with India, Thailand, and Uzbekistan. Against all three teams, Hibino played one match but lost all of them. Her first match was against Nigina Abduraimova from Uzbekistan where she won the first set but was not able to finish the match in her favor. The following day, her team played against India. Given that her compatriot Eri Hozumi won the first match, a win from her would secure a team win over India. However, Hibino lost to Ankita Raina. Since her team lost to Uzbekistan and won over India, they faced Thailand to be promoted to the Play-offs. Hibino had a disappointing start to her match against Luksika Kumkhum, losing the first set 6–0 but then managed to make a comeback. For the place in the World Group II Play-offs the next year, Japan faced Chinese Taipei. Hibino won the first set against Hsieh Su-wei but then lost the next two sets.

After one year of absence, she participated again at the Fed Cup. In Zone Group I, Hibino won all of her three matches. She started with a set loss against Thailand's Kumkhum but then won the following two. The same scenario then happened in the next match against South Korea's Han Na-Lae. The third one was against Hsu Chieh-Yu from Chinese Taipei, which she won in straight sets. Japan then played against Kazakhstan for their spot in the World Group II Play-offs. Even though they won, Hibino lost her match against Yulia Putintseva. The following year, Japan faced Spain in World Group II. Hibino played in the opening match against Sara Sorribes Tormo and won in straight sets. Following a win and loss for Japan, Hibino had her chance to secure her team a spot in the World Group Play-offs. However, she lost to Georgina García Pérez in three sets. Japan's situation improved in the Play-offs against the Netherlands, when Hibino defeated Bibiane Schoofs, letting her win only three games to help Japan win the tie.

Playing style

Hibino prefers an aggressive style of play. After defeating Hsieh Su-wei in the quarter-final at the 2019 Japan Women's Open, she described the match as 70 percent defense and 30 percent offense but stated that she has to be more aggressive. After defeating compatriot Misaki Doi in the final of the same tournament, Doi stated: "She has strong backhand but she was also using her forehand to structure points well giving me very little chance to play my game." Hibino can also be effective at the net to fend off a powerful strike from the player and secure a volley winner. One of the signatures of her style of play is the use of drop shots. She prefers hardcourts, but her favorite tournament is Wimbledon that is played on grass.

Coach
Since 2012, she has been coached by Japanese former player Eiji Takeuchi.

Apparel and equipment
Hibino has been sponsored by Le Coq Sportif for clothing. She uses a Yonex VCore 100 racket.

Performance timelines

Only main-draw results in WTA Tour, Grand Slam tournaments, Fed Cup/Billie Jean King Cup, and Olympic Games are included in win–loss records.

Singles
Current after the 2023 ATX Open.

Doubles
Current through the 2022 Monterrey Open.

WTA career finals

Singles: 5 (2 titles, 3 runner-ups)

Doubles: 6 (2 titles, 4 runner-ups)

ITF Circuit finals

Singles: 13 (8 titles, 5 runner–ups)

Doubles: 15 (10 titles, 5 runner–ups)

Wins over top-10 players

Notes

References

External links
 
 

1994 births
Living people
Japanese female tennis players
Sportspeople from Aichi Prefecture
Olympic tennis players of Japan
Tennis players at the 2016 Summer Olympics
Tennis players at the 2020 Summer Olympics